Aleksandr Vinogradov (born 20 June 1970) is a Russian ice hockey player. He competed in the men's tournament at the 1994 Winter Olympics.

Career statistics

Regular season and playoffs

International

References

External links

1970 births
Living people
Krylya Sovetov Moscow players
Lausitzer Füchse players
LHC Les Lions players
HC Lipetsk players
Luleå HF players
Russian ice hockey right wingers
SKA Saint Petersburg players
Skellefteå AIK players
HC Sibir Novosibirsk players
HC Vityaz players
Olympic ice hockey players of Russia
Ice hockey players at the 1994 Winter Olympics
Sportspeople from Kazan